List of generals of the Lithuanian Army includes people that were awarded the rank of general by the independent Republic of Lithuania in 1918–40 or since 1990.

Interwar
There were 54 generals awarded the rank in interwar Lithuania. Seven of them earned their rank in foreign military, i.e. Imperial Russian Army, Russian White Army, and British Army. Four men earned rank of general in foreign military and served in the Lithuanian Army, but were not awarded the rank of general in Lithuania and are therefore not included in the list below.

On September 13, 1919, Lithuania established two ranks of generals – lieutenant general and general. On December 11, 1936, these ranks were changed to brigadier general, divisional general, and general. After the Soviet occupation of Lithuania on June 15, 1940, the Lithuanian Army was reorganized into the 179th Rifle and 184th Rifle Divisions of the Red Army and adopted Russian ranks.

Four generals of the Imperial Russian Army served in the Lithuanian Army but were not officially recognized as generals in Lithuania:
 (in Lithuanian known as Vytautas Otockis or Otauskas; 1872–1923), claimed to be a general who lost his documents. He served in the Lithuanian army from May 1919 to March 1920. He later joined the Polish Army.
Kyprian Kandratovich (1859–1932) served from 24 November to 24 December 1918
Rapolas Okulič-Kazarinas (1857–1919) served from 28 March to 27 April 1919
Vladas Dionizas Slaboševičius (1861–1919) served from 1 July to 28 September 1919

Anti-Soviet resistance
Three men were posthumously awarded the rank of general for their contributions to the anti-Soviet Lithuanian Freedom Army and Lithuanian partisans in 1998. They did not serve as generals in the Lithuanian Army as it ceased to exist in 1940.

Post-Soviet
On March 11, 1990, Lithuania declared independence from the Soviet Union. The reestablished Lithuanian Army initially had two general ranks (lieutenant general and general), but the system was changed in 1998 to three ranks: brigadier general, major general, lieutenant general. In the Lithuanian Naval Force, the equivalent ranks are viceadmiral and admiral.
 

Temporary promotions to general were given to two individuals:
 Gintaras Bagdonas on 13 March 2007 to brigadier general
 Artūras Leita on 23 November 2007 and 11 January 2011 to brigadier general

References

Lithuania
Lithuania
Lists of Lithuanian military personnel